Oman competed at the 2012 Summer Olympics in London, from 27 July to 12 August 2012. This was the nation's eighth consecutive appearance at the Olympics.

Four athletes from Oman were selected to the team, competing only in athletics and shooting. This was also the nation's smallest delegation sent to the Olympics since 2004. Double trap shooter Ahmed Al-Hatmi was the nation's flag bearer at the opening ceremony. Oman, however, has yet to win its first ever Olympic medal.

Athletics

Athletes from Oman have so far achieved qualifying standards in the following athletics events (up to a maximum of 3 athletes in each event at the 'A' Standard, and 1 at the 'B' Standard):

Key
 Note – Ranks given for track events are within the athlete's heat only
 Q = Qualified for the next round
 q = Qualified for the next round as a fastest loser or, in field events, by position without achieving the qualifying target
 NR = National record
 N/A = Round not applicable for the event
 Bye = Athlete not required to compete in round

Men

Women

Shooting

Men

References

External links

Nations at the 2012 Summer Olympics
2012
2012 in Omani sport